Nicholas Mario Grigsby (born July 2, 1992) is an American football linebacker who is a free agent. He played college football at Pittsburgh. Grigsby was signed by the Los Angeles Rams as an undrafted free agent in 2016. He has also played for the New England Patriots, Detroit Lions, and Baltimore Ravens.

Professional career

Los Angeles Rams
After going undrafted in the 2016 NFL Draft, Grigsby signed with the Los Angeles Rams on May 4, 2016. On September 9, 2016, he was waived. Grigsby was signed to the Rams' practice squad on September 12, 2016. On November 22, 2016, he was promoted from the practice squad to the active roster.

On September 3, 2017, Grigsby was waived by the Rams.

Baltimore Ravens
On September 19, 2017, Grigsby was signed to the Baltimore Ravens' practice squad.

New England Patriots
On November 28, 2017, Grigsby was signed by the New England Patriots off the Ravens' practice squad. He appeared in 5 games and had 5 tackles. Grigsby and the Patriots made it to Super Bowl LII, but the Patriots lost 41-33 to the Philadelphia Eagles.

On November 13, 2018, the Patriots released Grigsby.

Detroit Lions
On November 17, 2018, Grigsby was signed to the Detroit Lions practice squad. He was promoted to the active roster on November 26, 2018. On February 15, 2019, Grigsby was released by the Lions.

Baltimore Ravens (second stint)
On July 31, 2019, Grigsby was signed by the Baltimore Ravens. He was waived on August 24, 2019.

Green Bay Packers
On August 25, 2019, Grigsby was claimed off waivers by the Green Bay Packers, but was waived the next day after failing his physical.

St. Louis BattleHawks
In October 2019, Grigsby was selected by the St. Louis BattleHawks in the 2020 XFL Draft. He was waived on January 8, 2020.

Ottawa Redblacks
Grigsby signed with the Ottawa Redblacks of the CFL on January 6, 2021. He was released on June 24, 2021.

References

External links
 Pittsburgh Panthers bio

1992 births
Living people
American football linebackers
Baltimore Ravens players
Detroit Lions players
Green Bay Packers players
Los Angeles Rams players
New England Patriots players
Ottawa Redblacks players
St. Louis BattleHawks players
People from Trotwood, Ohio
Pittsburgh Panthers football players
Players of American football from Ohio